Van Muydenbukta is a large, open bay on the northern side of Bellsund, on the west coast of Spitsbergen. It is named after the Dutchman Willem Cornelisz. van Muyden, commander of the Dutch whaling fleet in 1612 and 1613.

References

Conway, W. M. 1906. No Man's Land: A History of Spitsbergen from Its Discovery in 1596 to the Beginning of the Scientific Exploration of the Country. Cambridge: At the University Press. 
 Norwegian Polar Institute Place Names of Svalbard Database

Bays of Spitsbergen